Germaine Franco is an American film composer, conductor, songwriter, arranger, record producer, and percussionist. Franco is the first woman to score a Disney animated feature film with Encanto (2021), for which she was nominated for a Golden Globe, an SCL Award, an Annie Award, and an Academy Award for Best Original Score. She is also the first Latina to be nominated for the latter award, as well as the first to join the music branch of the Academy.

In 2018, Univision named Franco one of the Top 15 Latinas who are changing the world. Other film and television scores Franco has contributed to include Coco (2017), Tag (2018), Dope (2015), Vida (2018), Dora and the Lost City of Gold (2019), and Little (2019). Her work has been performed at concert halls such as the Walt Disney Concert Hall with The Los Angeles Master Chorale, The Puerto Rico Symphony, The Dallas Symphony Orchestra, The National Symphony Orchestra, and The Chicago Philharmonic, among others.

Early life
Franco began composing as a student at the Shepherd School of Music at Rice University, where she graduated in 1984. She is of Mexican American descent.

Filmography

References

Further reading 
Disney/Pixar's Coco Songbook: Music from the Original Motion Picture Soundtrack. Hal Leonard Corporation, 2017.
Heran Mamo, "Germaine Franco Talks Scoring 'Tag' & The Lack of Female Composers in Hollywood: 'It's Not a Glass Ceiling, It's Made of Cement'" (Billboard, 6/14/2018).

External links
 Official Website
 Germaine Franco on Twitter
 Germaine Franco on IMDb
 Germaine Franco on Discogs
 GERMAINE FRANCO - Getting into the business. Orchestral Tools (Mar 5, 2019). YouTube video.

American conductors (music)
American film score composers
American music arrangers
American musicians of Mexican descent
American percussionists
American women film score composers
American women record producers
Animated film score composers
Annie Award winners
Grammy Award winners
Latin music composers
Living people
Pixar people
Rice University alumni
Walt Disney Animation Studios people
Women conductors (music)
Year of birth missing (living people)